The 7th Visual Effects Society Awards, given in Los Angeles on February 21, 2009, at the Century Plaza Hotel, honored the best visual effects in film and television of 2008. The awards were later broadcast, in an edited form, on the Starz Edge Network on May 9, 2009.

Winners and nominees
(Winners in bold)

Honorary Awards
Lifetime Achievement Award:
Kathleen Kennedy and Frank Marshall

George Melies Award for Pioneering:
Phil Tippett

Film

Television

Other categories

References

External links
 Visual Effects Society

2008
Visual Effects Society Awards
Visual Effects Society Awards
Visual Effects Society Awards
Visual Effects Society Awards
Visual Effects Society Awards